Talen Jalee Horton-Tucker (born November 25, 2000) is an American professional basketball player for the Utah Jazz of the National Basketball Association (NBA). Horton-Tucker played college basketball for the Iowa State Cyclones.

Early life
Born in Chicago, Horton–Tucker was raised on the Northside of Chicago in the Uptown neighborhood. Horton–Tucker is the son of Shirley Horton and Marlin Tucker. For elementary school, Horton–Tucker attended St. Matthias Elementary School in Chicago, where he had his No. 5 jersey retired.

High school career
Horton–Tucker played at Simeon Career Academy where he helped the Wolverines to three straight City Championships. A four-star recruit in ESPN's ranking, he committed to Iowa State in October 2017, choosing the Cyclones over schools such as Illinois and Xavier.

College career
On November 20, 2018, Horton–Tucker scored a career-high 26 points and grabbed a career-high 14 rebounds in a win against Illinois. As a freshman, Horton–Tucker averaged 11.8 points, 4.9 rebounds, 2.3 assists and 1.3 steals in 27 minutes per game. Horton–Tucker declared for the 2019 NBA draft after his freshman season.

Professional career

Los Angeles Lakers (2019–2022)
On June 20, 2019, Horton-Tucker was selected as the 46th overall pick in the 2019 NBA draft by the Orlando Magic. He was traded on draft night to the Los Angeles Lakers in exchange for a 2020 second round draft pick and cash considerations. On July 13, 2019, Horton-Tucker signed with the Los Angeles Lakers. He was assigned to the Lakers’ NBA G League affiliate, the South Bay Lakers, for the opening of the G League season. He made his NBA debut on December 8, 2019, against the Minnesota Timberwolves. He received a larger role during the NBA Bubble as the Lakers had clinched the best record in the Western Conference and even started in the regular season finale.
On September 12, 2020, Horton-Tucker scored 9 points in 10 minutes off the bench in Game 5 of Western Conference semifinals, helping the Lakers secure a 119–96 victory against the Houston Rockets and advance into the next round. Horton-Tucker won an NBA championship when the Lakers defeated the Miami Heat in the 2020 NBA Finals in 6 games. He became the second-youngest player in NBA history to win a championship, at 19 years and 322 days.

After a strong preseason, Horton-Tucker became a regular rotational player in the 2020–21 regular season.  On January 10, 2021, he scored a career-high 17 points off the bench in the team's 120–102 win over the Houston Rockets. On February 4, he scored 17 points off the bench in the team's 114–93 win over the Denver Nuggets. On March 15, he scored a new career-high 18 points and recorded a career-high 10 assists in the team's 128–97 win over the Golden State Warriors. On April 8, Horton-Tucker was suspended for one game for leaving the bench during an altercation between the Lakers and the Toronto Raptors. On May 11, he scored the go-ahead three-pointer in the team's 101–99 overtime win against the New York Knicks.

On October 11, 2021, it was announced that Horton-Tucker would undergo surgery to repair torn ligaments in his right thumb, ruling him out for at least four weeks. At the 2022 trade deadline, Horton-Tucker was nearly dealt to the Toronto Raptors in a three team trade involving the New York Knicks.  On April 7, 2022, he scored a career-high 40 points in a 112–128 loss to the Golden State Warriors. In an disappointing 2021–22 season for the Lakers, Horton-Tucker averaged 10 points and 2.7 assists.

Utah Jazz (2022–present)
On August 25, 2022, Horton-Tucker was traded, alongside Stanley Johnson, to the Utah Jazz in exchange for Patrick Beverley. Horton-Tucker made his debut for the Jazz on October 19, recording three points and two steals in a 123–102 win over the Denver Nuggets.

Career statistics

NBA

Regular season

|-
| style="text-align:left; background:#afe6ba;"| 
| style="text-align:left;"| L.A. Lakers
| 6 || 1 || 13.5 || .467 || .308 || .500 || 1.2 || 1.0 || 1.3 || .2 || 5.7
|-
| style="text-align:left;| 
| style="text-align:left;"| L.A. Lakers
| 65 || 4 || 20.1 || .458 || .282 || .775 || 2.6 || 2.8 || 1.0 || .3 || 9.0
|-
| style="text-align:left;| 
| style="text-align:left;"| L.A. Lakers
| 60 || 19 || 25.2 || .416 || .269 || .800 || 3.2 || 2.7 || 1.0 || .5 || 10.0
|- class="sortbottom"
| style="text-align:center;" colspan="2"|Career
| 131 || 24 || 22.1 || .437 || .276 || .783 || 2.8 || 2.6 || 1.0 || .4 || 9.3

Playoffs

|-
|style="text-align:left;background:#afe6ba;"|2020
|style="text-align:left;"|L.A. Lakers
| 2 || 0 || 8.5 || .500 || .400 || — || 2.5 || .0 || 1.0 || .0 || 7.0
|-
|style="text-align:left;"|2021
|style="text-align:left;"|L.A. Lakers
| 4 || 0 || 12.0 || .458 || .200 || .600 || 3.5 || .5 || .3 || .0 || 6.5
|- class="sortbottom"
|style="text-align:center;" colspan="2"|Career
| 6 || 0 || 10.8 || .472 || .300 || .600 || 3.2 || .3 || .5 || .0 || 6.7

College

|-
| style="text-align:left;"| 2018–19
| style="text-align:left;"| Iowa State
| 35 || 34 || 27.2 || .406 || .308 || .625 || 4.9 || 2.3 || 1.3 || .7 || 11.8

References

External links
 
 Iowa State Cyclones bio

2000 births
Living people
21st-century African-American sportspeople
African-American basketball players
American men's basketball players
Basketball players from Chicago
Iowa State Cyclones men's basketball players
Los Angeles Lakers players
Orlando Magic draft picks
Shooting guards
South Bay Lakers players
Utah Jazz players